Poverty bush is a common name for several plants and may refer to:

Acacia translucens, a shrub that occurs on spinifex plains in northern Australia
Acacia stellaticeps, a shrub found in the north of Western Australia
Eremophila (plant), a genus of plants of the family Myoporaceae, endemic to arid regions of Australia
Kunzea ambigua, a shrub found in eastern Australia, also known as white kunzea or tick bush